Rock of Ages is a jukebox musical built around classic rock songs from the 1980s, especially from the famous glam metal bands of that decade. The musical features songs from Styx, Journey, Bon Jovi, Pat Benatar, Twisted Sister, Steve Perry, Poison and Europe, among other well-known rock bands. It was written by Chris D'Arienzo, directed by Kristin Hanggi and choreographed by Kelly Devine with music supervision, arrangements and orchestrations by Ethan Popp.

During the show, the performers frequently break the "fourth wall", directly addressing the audience and seemingly forgetting (or perhaps reminding the audience) that they are actors in a musical. Despite the musical's title, the Def Leppard song of the same name is not included in the musical.

The original Broadway production ran for 2,328 performances, closing on January 18, 2015 tied as the 32nd-longest running show in Broadway history. Since debuting on the Great White Way in 2009, it has spawned replica productions worldwide in Japan, Australia and the United Kingdom among others, as well as several touring productions.

Synopsis

Act I
Lonny Barnett, who serves as the show's narrator, sets up the story: In 1987, an aspiring rocker named Drew Boley works as a busboy in the Hollywood bar/club called the Bourbon Room, owned by Dennis Dupree and assisted by Lonny ("Just Like Paradise/Nothin' But a Good Time"). He falls instantly for a girl, Sherrie Christian, who just arrived from Paola, Kansas, hoping to make it big in acting ("Sister Christian"). Drew convinces Dennis to hire Sherrie as a waitress.

A pair of German developers, Hertz Klinemann and his son Franz, persuade the city's mayor to abandon the "sex, drugs and rock-n-roll" lifestyle of the Sunset Strip and introduce "clean living" into the area, much to the anger of the City Planner, Regina ("We Built This City"). When Dennis learns that part of the plan involves demolishing The Bourbon Room, he believes the club can generate more money by having rock star Stacee Jaxx and his band Arsenal, who recently announced their break-up, perform their last show at the Bourbon ("Too Much Time on My Hands"). He calls Stacee and convinces him to play the band's last show in the club where he had begun. As Drew struggles to write new lyrics, Sherrie urges him to go after his dreams ("I Wanna Rock"). Regina begins protesting Hertz and Franz's redevelopment plans ("We're Not Gonna Take It").

Later, after arguing with her parents during a phone call, Sherrie begins to discover feelings for Drew, who supports her dream. Also, Drew, auditioning to open for Arsenal, finds the lyrics he has been searching for and realizes that they have come from his feelings for Sherrie ("More Than Words/Heaven/To Be with You"). After obtaining the opening slot for Arsenal, Drew invites Sherrie to have a picnic in the hills overlooking Los Angeles ("Waiting For a Girl Like You"). There, he suggests that the two are merely friends to calm their nerves, disappointing both of them and ruining the date.

Stacee Jaxx arrives at the Bourbon and gives an interview about his life ("Wanted Dead or Alive"). Sherrie is immediately smitten with him, and believing she means nothing to Drew, has sex with Stacee in the men's room ("I Want to Know What Love Is"). While Stacee and Sherrie are copulating, Drew opens for Stacee and Arsenal, not knowing a record producer is in the audience. After their tryst, Stacee tells Dennis to dismiss Sherrie before the concert begins. His guitarist realizes what Stacee did and knocks him out. A record producer, Ja'Keith Gill, in the club was impressed with Drew's performance and suggests he take over for Stacee. He then offers Drew a contract, which he accepts. Sherrie seeks comfort from Drew after she is fired, but having seen her go into the men's room with Stacee, he dismisses her ("Cum on Feel the Noize"). In the midst of these events, Regina continues her protest ("We're Not Gonna Take It [Reprise]").

An upset and unemployed Sherrie meets Justice Charlier, the owner of the nearby Venus Club, which Justice prefers to call a "gentleman's club." She relates to Sherrie's story, saying that many of the small-town girls hoping to hit it big in LA end up making a living as strippers. Grudgingly, Sherrie accepts Justice's offer to work in her club ("Harden My Heart/Shadows of the Night"). As the act closes, everyone is alone – Drew, as a soon-to-be rock star; Sherrie, fending for herself as an exotic dancer; Regina protesting the redevelopment; and Dennis, trying to save his club ("Here I Go Again").

Act II
Hertz and Franz begin demolition on the Sunset Strip, alienating them from each other as Franz falls for Regina and sees "the error of their ways." Dennis and Lonny join the fight with little success ("The Final Countdown"). Drew's rocker image is upsetting Ja'Keith, and Sherrie is learning how things work at the Venus Club ("Any Way You Want It/I Wanna Rock [Reprise]"). When they meet on the street, Sherrie is embarrassed about her job and Drew is upset that his record company is attempting to reshape him into part of a hip-hop boy band, "Street Boyz," as Joshy J. They argue and Sherrie admits that she was crazy about Drew, but failed to make a move because he said they were friends. They part ways more troubled by these new revelations ("High Enough").

A drunken Stacee arrives at the Venus Club and is pleased to see Sherrie. After being forced to give him a lap-dance, she beats him up while dancing ("I Hate Myself for Loving You/Heat of the Moment"). Drew arrives to admit his feelings to her, but becomes angry when he sees the two in a suggestive position and storms off. Justice later tells Drew that as soon as he left, Sherrie punched Stacee in the jaw.

Regina continues her protest against the destruction of the Strip, but it yields no success. She convinces Franz to stand up to his father if he does not believe in his father's vision. Franz admits that he has his own dream: to open a confectioner's store in Germany. He rebels against his father and admits his love for Regina ("Hit Me with Your Best Shot"). Meanwhile, Dennis and Lonny, upset at the loss of The Bourbon Room, admit that they have feelings for each other ("Can't Fight This Feeling").

Sherrie decides to leave the Venus Club after the scene with Drew, and Justice tells her that she had a similar experience with her first love. Everyone is in turmoil as they attempt to move on with their lives ("Every Rose Has Its Thorn"). Franz leaves for Germany and Hertz begins to regret the hurtful way he treated his son ("Keep on Loving You"). Regina arrives and explains to Hertz that Franz does not hate him; he simply wants his father to support his dream. Hertz decides to return the deed to the Bourbon Room to Dennis and invest in Franz's confectionery store.

Drew, now a pizza delivery boy, realizes none of his dreams have come true—he still is not a rock star, and Sherrie is leaving on a midnight train. Lonny arrives and breaks the  fourth wall by explaining to Drew that his life is so miserable because they are all characters in a musical and that it was their book writer who made it so. He also reveals to Drew that he serves as the show's "dramatic conjurer" and that if Drew wants a happy ending, it is up to him to get the girl. After hearing this, Drew realizes that he does not need fame to make him happy, only Sherrie ("Oh Sherrie"). He reaches her at the train station in time, where they realize that their love has survived all their trials and reconcile ("The Search Is Over").

In the epilogue, The Bourbon Room is spared from demolition and Stacee Jaxx, now a washed-up has-been who has been charged with statutory rape, flees to Uruguay ("Renegade"). Franz opens his confectionery store in Germany and has a long-distance relationship with Regina, who becomes the new mayor of West Hollywood. Dennis passes away, leaving the Bourbon Room to Lonny, and Sherrie and Drew move to Glendale and start a family. Lonny notes that on The Strip, sometimes the dreams with which you enter are not always the dreams with which you leave, but they still rock ("Don't Stop Believin'").

Productions

Pre-Broadway
Los Angeles (2005, 2006)
The musical premiered on July 27, 2005 in Los Angeles at King King, a club on Hollywood Boulevard where it ran for a limited engagement. It later moved to the Vanguard Hollywood in January 2006 for a second short run.

Following the successful run at the Vanguard, the show then moved to Ren-Mar Studios where it played to sold-out crowds. In May 2006 there was a short run at the Flamingo in Las Vegas.

Off-Broadway (2008–2009)
The musical opened Off-Broadway at New World Stages on October 16, 2008 and ran through January 4, 2009. Kelly Devine was the new choreographer, and Ethan Popp was brought in to music supervise, as well as create new arrangements and orchestrations for the production.

Broadway
(2009–2015)
The musical then transferred to Broadway. Previews began March 17, 2009 at the Brooks Atkinson Theatre, officially opening on April 7, 2009. The Broadway production temporarily closed on January 9, 2011 and moved to the Helen Hayes Theatre, where it resumed performances March 24, 2011.

The show's band had significant stage time compared to other musicals' bands and orchestra members. The band dressed in typical metalhead costumes, fitting with their role as Stacee's back up band, and always on-stage. The drummer played inside a cage with a sign on it that read "Please don't feed the drummer". One of the original guitarists in the stage band, Joel Hoekstra, is a former member of Night Ranger (whose hit "Sister Christian" was performed in the show) and current member of Whitesnake (whose song "Here I Go Again" was also performed in the show). Another guitarist Tommy Kessler is also a member of the band Blondie.

The show closed on January 18, 2015 after 22 previews and 2,328 regular performances, placing Rock of Ages in a tie with Man of La Mancha as Broadway's 32nd-longest running show of all-time.

UK productions
London's West End (2011–2013)
The UK premiere of the show began previews on August 31, 2011 at the Shaftesbury Theatre in the West End. Opening night took place on September 27, 2011. Amy Pemberton was originally cast as Sherrie but due to illness was forced to withdraw from the show. She performed for the first week of previews and at West End Live 2011. She remained on extended leave while her understudy Natalie Andreou played the role. Pemberton later decided that she would not be returning to the role and Andreou was given it permanently. Andreou performed on opening night.

The show transferred to the Garrick Theatre in January 2013, where it closed on November 2, 2013 concluding a two-year West End run.

First National UK Tour (2014)
Following its West End closure, the musical began a national tour of the U.K. and Ireland. Performances began at the Palace Theatre, Manchester on May 3, 2014. It is scheduled to visit 27 venues, before concluding at the New Theatre, Wimbledon, London on November 22, 2014.

Second National UK Tour (2018-2021)
A second national tour began on 25 September 2018 in Manchester and was supplied to finish on 27 July 2019, with the final shows in Sunderland. Instead, the tour extended by one week and went to Leeds and the tour concluded there on 3 August 2019. A return tour has been slated to start on 6 May 2021 in Portsmouth at the Kings Theatre, Southsea

Other notable productions

Toronto (2010–2011)
Previews for the Canadian production began April 20, 2010 at the Royal Alexandra Theater in Toronto, Ontario, with the official opening on May 11, 2010. An open casting call was held to find new talent. The run lasted for eight months, with closing night taking place on January 2, 2011.

First North American tour (2010–2011)
The first national touring production of North America began performances at the Bank of America Theatre in Chicago, Illinois on September 21, 2010 and ran for ten months, closing at the National Theater in Washington, D.C. on July 24, 2011. The tour visited sixty additional venues.

Second North American tour (Non-Equity) (2011–2014)
A second national tour launched on October 4, 2011 in Providence, Rhode Island. It features a Non-AEA cast.

At the second national tour's 2012 stop in Austin, TX, critic Jeff Davis of BroadwayWorld.com gave the show a glowing review, calling it "the funniest, and often filthiest, jukebox musical" and gave high praise to the entire cast, saying "In addition to a stellar cast of principals, Rock of Ages features one of the hardest-working ensembles I’ve ever seen.  They have more energy than a cokehead groupie, and they clearly have fun as the belt out rock standards, making the six-year-old show still feel fresh and new".

After nearly three years touring the United States, Canada, and Puerto Rico, the Second National tour closed at Resorts World Sentosa in Singapore. The two-and-a-half-week sit ran from August 6, 2014 through August 24, 2014.

Melbourne & Brisbane, Australia (2011)
The musical made its Australian premiere in April 2011 at the Comedy Theatre in Melbourne, with previews from March 2011. The production moved to the Lyric Theatre, QPAC in Brisbane from November 2011, where it closed on December 4, 2011.

Manila (2012, 2013, 2014)
Rock of Ages made its Asian English-language premiere with Atlantis Productions in Manila, Philippines. In this production, Mig Ayesa reprised the role of Stacee Jaxx, along with Nyoy Volante as Drew and Vina Morales as Sherrie. Also of note was Aiza Seguerra as Regina. The initial production was performed in the Carlos P. Romulo Theater at the RCBC Plaza in Makati from June 15, 2012 to July 8, 2012.

In 2013, Rock of Ages returned to Manila for a repeat run. Most of the original cast returned with the most notable exception being Rachel Alejandro replacing Jinky Llamanzares as Justice. This second run was also performed at the Carlos P. Romulo Theater from July 12, 2013 to July 28, 2013.

Las Vegas (2012–2017)
At the June 1, 2012, opening of the Bourbon Room on the casino floor at The Venetian, Las Vegas, it was announced that Rock of Ages would be coming to one of the resort's theaters beginning in December 2012. A “surprise” flashmob was deployed at the grand opening as the Venetian's president, John Caparella, announced the musical's new residency. The Venetian features an actual replica of “The Bourbon Room” complete with 1980s video music hosted by VJ Marvellous Mark and professional dancers, known as The Bourbon Babes.
Rock of Vegas closed at Venetian on January 3, 2016 and transferred to the Rio Hotel and Casino. The show played its final performance at the Rio on January 1, 2017.

South Africa (2017)
In July 2017 it was announced that a non-replica production of Rock of Ages was to open in November 2017  at the Lyric Theatre at Gold Reef City, South Africa.

International Productions

The musical has had various international productions including Mexico City, Panama City, Guatemala City, Germany, Malta, Quebec, Trois Rivières and Montreal.

Switzerland (2019)
In March 2019 it was announced that a production of Rock of Ages was to open in December 2019 at Le Théâtre, Emmen, Switzerland.

Tenth Anniversary US National Tour   & Off-Broadway Revival (2019)

In 2019, It was announced that Rock of Ages would celebrate its tenth anniversary by going on a North American Tour in the U.S. and Canada for the first time since 2011. An off-Broadway revival production premiered on June 19, 2019, at New World Stages. Originally slated for a 16-week run, the show became an open-ended production on November 13, 2019. The anniversary production off-Broadway featured Dot-Marie Jones as the first female Dennis. As of March 12, production was suspended through June 7, 2020, due to the COVID-19 pandemic. This suspension was extended and the show was closed permanently on June 7, 2021.

Film

The film rights for Rock of Ages were sold to Warner Bros. and New Line Cinema. The film is directed by Adam Shankman and was originally expected to begin production in the summer of 2010, but started shooting in May 2011, for a June 15, 2012, theatrical release.
Tom Cruise plays Stacee Jaxx in the film. Shankman knew Cruise was in when he heard him during a voice lesson, confirming he "has a fantastic voice." Cruise sang five hours a day to prepare for his role. "It's this brilliant mashup, it seems, of Axl Rose, Keith Richards and Jim Morrison." Shankman said of Cruise's performance.

On February 14, 2011, it was announced that Mary J. Blige had signed on to play Justice Charlier in the film. On March 3, 2011, it was confirmed that Julianne Hough would play the role of Sherrie. On March 6, 2011, it was confirmed that Alec Baldwin would play the role of Dennis Dupree. On March 24, 2011, it was announced that Paul Giamatti would be in the film, playing the manager of Stacee Jaxx.

Constantine Maroulis, Broadway's original Drew, makes a cameo appearance in the film. Joel Hoekstra and David Gibbs also make appearances, as do Broadway producers Matt Weaver and Barry Habib.

Casts of major productions

Notable Broadway replacements

 Drew – Jeremy Jordan, Joey Taranto, Dan Domenech, Justin Matthew Sargent, Aaron C. Finley, Tony LePage, Conor Mellor
 Sherrie – Savannah Wise, Kerry Butler, Emily Padgett, Becca Tobin, Rebecca Faulkenberry, Ashley Spencer, Kate Rockwell, Katie Webber, Ericka Hunter, Carrie St. Louis, Lauren Zakrin

 Lonny – Jay Klaitz, Genson Blimline
 Franz – Tom Lenk, Derek St. Pierre, Cody Scott Lancaster, Frankie Grande
 Stacee Jaxx – Mitchell Jarvis, MiG Ayesa, Jeremy Woodard, Joey Calveri, Chester See

 Dennis – Dee Snider, Nick Cordero, Matt Ban
 Regina – Josephine Rose Roberts, Randi Zuckerberg (Regina only)
 Justice – Teresa Stanley
 Hertz – Don Stephenson, Bret Tuomi, Matthew Stocke
 Waitress #1 - Davette Weibel

Musical numbers

Act I

Act II

† Not on Original Broadway Cast Recording

‡ The song "Rock of Ages" by Def Leppard is not in the musical because Universal Music Group refuse to grant license. However, the original recording is often played after curtain call.

Instrumentation
The songs are played in the 80s rock music style by the house band, Arsenal, appearing at the back of the stage rather than in the more traditional pit.

Awards and nominations

Original Broadway production

See also
 We Will Rock You

References

External links
 Official site of Rock of Ages London
 Official site of Rock of Ages Broadway
 Internet Broadway Database listing

2009 musicals
Off-Broadway musicals
American rock musicals
Broadway musicals
West End musicals
Jukebox musicals
Glam metal
Plays set in the 1980s